"You Go to My Head" is a 1938 popular song composed by J. Fred Coots with lyrics by Haven Gillespie. Numerous versions of the song have been recorded, and it has since become a pop and jazz standard.

Melody and lyrics
Alec Wilder terms Coots' melody a "minor masterpiece". According to Ted Gioia, “’You Go to my Head’ is an intricately constructed affair with plenty of harmonic movement.  The song starts in a major key, but from the second bar onward, Mr. Coots seems intent on creating a feverish dream quality tending more to the minor mode.  The release builds on the drama, and the final restatement holds some surprises as well.  The piece would be noteworthy even if it lacked such an exquisite coda, but those last eight bars convey a sense of resigned closure to the song that fittingly matches the resolution of the lyrics.”  Gillespie's lyrics begin: "You go to my head and you linger like a haunting refrain".

Recordings, use in film, and performances

Larry Clinton recorded the song with his orchestra and with vocals by Bea Wain on February 24, 1938, and the song became a hit, eventually reaching #3 on the pop charts. It inspired an answer song, "You Went To My Head" (by Joseph Meyer, Bob Emmerich, and Buddy Bernier) that was recorded by Fats Waller on March 11, 1938, and again by Duke Ellington (featuring a vocal by Ivie Anderson) on April 17, 1938. The song was later recorded in 1938 by Teddy Wilson with a vocal by Nan Wynn, by Billie Holiday., and by Glen Gray's Casa Loma Orchestra. The Wilson, Holiday, and Gray versions all placed in the top-20 of the music charts in 1938. The song is played in Laura (1944 film) and  The Big Sleep (1946 film). The Louis Armstrong and Oscar Peterson version of the song is played in the movie Corrina, Corrina (film).

In 1953, Frank Sinatra sang the song before a live television audience of 60 million persons (broadcast live over the NBC and CBS networks) as part of The Ford 50th Anniversary Show.

On 23 April 1961, Judy Garland performed the song at the Judy at Carnegie Hall concert. Bryan Ferry recorded the song as a single with a video in 1975 reaching No. 33 in the UK charts.

Other versions
 Dave Brubeck and Paul Desmond – Jazz at Storyville (1952)
 Betty Carter – It's Not About the Melody (1992)
 Casa Loma Orchestra with Kenny Sargent – 1938
 Jan Savitt and his orchestra with Carlotta Dale - 1938
 Leslie 'Hutch' Hutchinson - 193?
 Billie Holiday – 1938
 Coleman Hawkins with Milt Jackson – 1946
 Doris Day – on her album You're My Thrill (1949)
 Bing Crosby
 Miles Davis
 Ella Fitzgerald - Hello, Love (1959) 
 Bill Evans with Freddie Hubbard and Jim Hall – Interplay (1962)
 Bill Evans - Some Other Time: The Lost Session From The Black Forest - 1968
 Shirley Horn with Joe Henderson – The Main Ingredient (1995)
 Dianne Reeves with Nicholas Payton – A Little Moonlight (2002)
 Rod Stewart - It Had to Be You: The Great American Songbook (2002)
Kurt Rosenwinkel - "Standards Trio: Reflections" (2009)
 Paulette McWilliams and Bobby Caldwell - “You Go to My Head” (2012)
 Cassandra Wilson – Coming Forth by Day (2015) Joe Pass and Ella Fitzgerald
 Bob Dylan – Triplicate (2017)
 Chuck Berry – Chuck (2017)

See also
List of 1930s jazz standards
Picardy Third

References

1938 songs
1930s jazz standards
Frank Sinatra songs
Pop standards
Judy Garland songs
Billie Holiday songs
Bryan Ferry songs
Songs with music by John Frederick Coots
Songs with lyrics by Haven Gillespie
Jazz compositions in E-flat major